Els Límits is a Spanish village, a civil parish of the municipality of La Jonquera, situated in the province of Girona, Catalonia, in Spain. As of 2005 its population was of 115. Its Spanish name is Los Límites.

History
The origins of the division of the village go back to the 17th century when, with the Treaty of the Pyrenees (after the 1635-1659 Franco-Spanish War), the frontier line between France and Spain was established along the mountain range of the Pyrenees.

Geography

Els Límits, which name means "The Border", is situated on the borders with Languedoc-Roussillon (France), close to the historical region of Vallespir. Its contiguous French twin town, Le Perthus (a municipality in the Pyrénées-Orientales department), is situated in the north and west side of the urban area. Also part of the main road, Avinguda d'Espanya, is both in France and Spain; and its western side (in Le Perthus) is named Avenue de France.

Out of the main road, in which is situated the checkpoint, the other principal roads are Carrer del Doctor Subiros, Calle del Correc (binational), Carrer de Fàtima and Carrer d'Hannibal. It lies 5 km (3 mi) from La Jonquera, 27 km (17 mi) from Figueres, 35 km (22 mi) from Perpignan/Perpinyà, 63 km (39 mi) from Girona and 160 km (99 mi) from Barcelona.

Gallery

Economy
As a border town between Spain and France, it is largely composed by trade buildings and it is almost entirely devoted to the sale of alcohol, tobacco and other goods which are considerably cheaper than in France. In earlier times, as Le Perthus, it was a convenient centre of contraband.

Transport
Els Límits, not served by the railway, is crossed by the national road N-II, which continues as Route nationale 9 (RN9) entering French territory. The adjacent motorway, AP-7 (La Jonquera-Barcelona-Valencia-Alicante-Vera), continues as A9 (Le Perthus-Perpignan-Montpellier-Orange) in France. The nearest motorway exits are "La Jonquera" (AP-7) and "Le Boulou" (A9).

See also
Fort de Bellegarde (on a hilltop above Le Perthus)

References

External links

Localities of Spain
Populated places in Alt Empordà
Divided cities
France–Spain border crossings